Kerzhnerocossus is a monotypic genus of moths in the family Cossidae. It contains only one species, Kerzhnerocossus sambainu, which is found in Mongolia.

References

Natural History Museum Lepidoptera generic names catalog

Cossinae
Monotypic moth genera
Moths described in 2011
Moths of Asia